Elelea is a genus of longhorn beetles of the subfamily Lamiinae, containing the following species:

 Elelea concinna (Pascoe, 1857)
 Elelea multipunctata Heller, 1923

References

Mesosini